Revenge is a harmful action against a person or group in response to a grievance.

Revenge or The Revenge may also refer to:

Ships
 HMS Revenge, disambiguation page for multiple ships of this name
 USS Revenge, disambiguation page for multiple ships of this name

Books
 Revenge (novel), or The Stars' Tennis Balls, a 2000 novel by Stephen Fry 
Revenge, a 2013 crime novel by Martina Cole  
 Revenge: Eleven Dark Tales, a 1998 short story collection by Yōko Ogawa

Film and TV

Film
 Revenge (1918 film), American western by Tod Browning
 Revenge (1928 film), an American silent drama film
 Revenge (1948 film), a Mexican crime film
 Revenge (1962 film) or Wonhanui Irwoldo, South Korean film featuring Park Am
 Revenge (1968 film) or Boksu, South Korean film featuring Park No-sik
 Revenge (1969 film), Italian film of 1969
 Revenge (1971 film), British thriller by Sidney Hayers
 Revenge (1978 film), Romanian Film 
 Blood Feud (1978 film), also known as Revenge, Italian thriller by Lina Wertmüller
 Revenge (1989 film) (Russian: Mest), Soviet film by Yermek Shinarbayev also known as The Red Flute
 Revenge (1985 film), Malayalam film
 Revenge (1990 film), American crime thriller starring Kevin Costner
 The Revenge (film), 2002 Polish film by Andrzej Wajda
 Revenge: A Love Story, 2010 Hong Kong film by Wong Ching-Po
 Hevn (Revenge), 2015 Norwegian-Canadian film by Kjersti Steinsbø
 Revenge (2017 film), a French rape and revenge action-thriller film by Coralie Fargeat

Television
 Revenge (TV series), a 2011–15 American drama program
 The Revenge (TV series), a 2021 Thai program featuring Chanon Santinatornkul
 SuperBrawl Revenge, a 2001 professional wrestling pay-per-view event

Episodes
 "Revenge" (Alfred Hitchcock Presents), 1955
 "Revenge" (NCIS), 2013
 "Revenge" (Star Wars: The Clone Wars), 2012
 "Revenge" (Survivors), 1975
 "The Revenge" (Seinfeld), 1991

Music 
 Revenge (Canadian band), a black metal band
 Revenge (UK band), a band led by New Order bassist Peter Hook

Albums
 Revenge! (Charles Mingus album) (recorded 1964, released 1996)
 Revenge (Bill Cosby album), a 1967 comedy album
 Revenge (Eurythmics album) (1986)
 Revenge (T.S.O.L. album) (1986)
 Revenge (Kiss album) (1992)
Revenge (Janis Ian album) (1995)
 Revenge (The Flying Luttenbachers album) (1996)
 Revenge (Cro-Mags album) (2000)
 Revenge (Paragon album) (2005)
 Revenge (Iron Fire album) (2006)
 Revenge (XXXTentacion mixtape) (2017)
 The Revenge (album), a 2007 album by Jorn Lande and Russell Allen
 Revenge, a 2011 album by Bobby Creekwater
 Revenge, a 2005 album by Vitalij Kuprij
 Three Cheers for Sweet Revenge, also known as Revenge, a 2004 album by My Chemical Romance

Songs
 "Revenge", a 1961 Brook Benton song cowritten by Benton
 "Revenge" (CaptainSparklez song), a parody of Usher's "DJ Got Us Fallin' in Love", 2011
 "Revenge" (Pink song), 2017
 "Revenge" (XXXTentacion song), 2017
 "Revenge", by Patti Smith Group from Wave
 "Revenge", by Black Flag from Jealous Again
 "Revenge", by Eurythmics from In the Garden
 "Revenge", by Ministry from With Sympathy
 "Revenge", by Papa Roach from Infest
 "Revenge", by Mindless Self Indulgence from Alienating Our Audience
 "Revenge", by Plain White T's from All That We Needed
 "Revenge", by Switchfoot from Oh! Gravity.
 "Revenge", by White Zombie from Let Sleeping Corpses Lie
 "Revenge", by Chevelle from Hats Off to the Bull
 "Revenge", by Joyner Lucas from ADHD

Other
Zemsta (Revenge), an 1834 comedy play by Polish writer Aleksander Fredro
 The Revenge, a 1978 UK radio play by Andrew Sachs
 Revenge: The Rematches, a 1994 boxing card in Las Vegas, Nevada

See also
 Avenger (disambiguation)
 Reprisal
 Retaliation (disambiguation)
 Retorsion
 Retribution (disambiguation)
 Vengeance (disambiguation)